Bradley Robert Jacobs (born June 11, 1985) is a Canadian curler from Sault Ste. Marie, Ontario. He is an Olympic champion skip, having led Canada to a gold medal at the 2014 Winter Olympics. Jacobs is also the 2013 Tim Hortons Brier championship skip and the 2013 World Championship runner-up. He is an 12-time Northern Ontario provincial champion, and one time provincial junior champion.

Jacobs and his team are well known for their physical fitness. They have been described as "fitness freaks" and are "embracing curling's athletic evolution as much or more than any other team".

Jacobs was born in Sault Ste. Marie, the son of Bob and Cynthia Jacobs ( Harnden).

Career

Junior career
Jacobs began curling at age ten with a coach named Tom Coulterman in 1995. Coulterman saw potential in them and formed a team, Jacobs played third for   Ryan Harnden and was also joined by Matt Premo and Scott Seabrook.  As Jacobs entered high school, he entered competitive curling and took it seriously. He played second for Harnden in tournaments age 16 and under and played second for E. J. Harnden on the highschool team. In the fall, they formed a team together with E.J. as skip, Ryan as second, and Jacobs threw lead stones. They came third in the tournament. By Fall 2001, they added Caleb Flaxey at third. They were starting to feel comfortable enough as a team that they entered the Regal Capital Curling Classic men's bonspiel at their home club. The bonspiel included most of the best teams from the region, including one skipped by Al Harnden and featuring Eric Harnden. 1998 men's Olympic curling champion Patrick Hurlimann also was in the bonspiel. In the first draw, they were matched against Hurlimann. They won the game 5-3. "Once we got the lead, they were kind of shocked," Flaxey told the Sault Star. Hurlimann was sure that "they will have a bright future".

He had a successful junior career, winning the Northern Ontario Junior Men's Championship in 2005 with teammates Brady Barnett, Scott Seabrook and Steve Molodowich. This gave his team a berth at the 2005 Canadian Junior Curling Championships, representing the region. At the Canadian Juniors, he led the team to an 8–4 record, good enough for fourth place, but outside the playoffs.

Men's career
Jacobs was then picked up to play for his uncle, Al Harnden, with Jacobs throwing last rocks on the team. The team finished 5–6 at the 2007 Tim Hortons Brier. Jacobs participated in the 2008 Tim Hortons Brier as an alternate for another uncle, Eric Harnden. In 2008, Jacobs formed his own team with his cousins (Eric's sons) E. J. Harnden and Ryan Harnden as well as Caleb Flaxey. The team won the Northern Ontario provincial title in 2010, qualifying for the 2010 Tim Hortons Brier where they made the playoffs, the first team from Northern Ontario to do that since the 1993 Labatt Brier. Jacobs' team represented Northern Ontario again at the 2011 Tim Hortons Brier, where they finished with a 7–4 record, out of the playoffs. The team went to the Brier again in 2012, where they finished 5–6. The following year at the 2013 Tim Hortons Brier, they became the first team from Northern Ontario to win the Brier since 1985. The win gave them the right to represent Canada at the 2013 Ford World Men's Curling Championship. At the Worlds, Jacobs skipped the Canadian team to a silver medal, losing to Sweden's Niklas Edin in the final. Brad Jacobs also led his team to a 9-3 victory in the men's final of the 2014 Winter Olympics by defeating Great Britain.

Following their Olympic success, the Jacobs rink once again made it to the Brier in 2015. After posting a 10-1 round robin record in first place, they won the 1 vs. 2 game sending them to the finals against the defending Brier champions, Team Canada (skipped by Pat Simmons), which they lost. Later in the season the Jacobs rink won their first career Grand Slam event, winning the 2015 Players' Championship.

At the 2016 Tim Hortons Brier, the Jacobs rink once again tore through the round robin, going undefeated to finish in first place. However, they ran into trouble in the playoffs, losing to Newfoundland and Labrador in the 1 vs. 2 game and to Alberta in the semifinals. They did rebound in the bronze medal game, defeating Manitoba to finish third overall.

The 2016-17 season would be the best to date for the Jacobs rink on the World Curling Tour, winning two slams, the 2016 Boost National and the 2017 Humpty's Champions Cup. At the 2017 Tim Hortons Brier, the team would once again make the playoffs, after posting an 8-3 round robin record. However, they lost both of their playoff games, settling for fourth place.

Jacobs played in the 2017 Canadian Olympic Curling Trials attempting to head to the Olympics again, but his team would finish with a disappointing 3-5 record, missing the playoffs. The team again represented Northern Ontario at the 2018 Tim Hortons Brier, making it to the playoffs with an 8-3 record, but lost to Alberta's Brendan Bottcher rink in the 3 vs. 4 game.

The next season, the Jacobs rink won the 2018 Tour Challenge Grand Slam event. A month later, the team won the 2018 Canada Cup, their first Canada Cup title, defeating Kevin Koe's rink in the final. The team had Marc Kennedy playing third, filling in for Ryan Fry, who is on sabbatical following unsportsmanlike behaviour and excessive drinking at the 2018 Red Deer Curling Classic.
The team once again represented Northern Ontario at the 2019 Tim Hortons Brier. The team went 9-2 in the round robin and championship round combined. Jacobs lost the 1vs2 game to Kevin Koe and the semifinal to Brendan Bottcher resulting in the team getting the bronze medal.

The following season, the team officially added Kennedy to the line-up at third with Fry going to play with John Epping. In their first event, the 2019 AMJ Campbell Shorty Jenkins Classic, the team went undefeated up until the final where they would lose to former teammate Fry and Team Epping. Team Jacobs won three straight Grand Slam events, at the Tour Challenge, National and the Canadian Open. They would win the 2020 Northern Ontario Men's Provincial Curling Championship for the sixth year in a row. At the 2020 Tim Hortons Brier, they battled through two tiebreakers before losing to Newfoundland and Labrador's Brad Gushue in the 3 vs. 4 game, all within the same day. It would be the team's last event of the season as both the Players' Championship and the Champions Cup Grand Slam events were cancelled due to the COVID-19 pandemic.

Team Jacobs played in two tour events during the 2020–21 season, winning the Stu Sells Oakville Tankard and losing in the qualification game of the Ashley HomeStore Curling Classic. Due to the COVID-19 pandemic in Ontario, the 2021 provincial championship was cancelled. As the reigning provincial champions, Team Jacobs was chosen to represent Northern Ontario at the 2021 Tim Hortons Brier. At the Brier, Jacobs led his team to a 7–5 sixth place finish. They wrapped up the season by making it to the quarterfinals of the 2021 Champions Cup and the semifinals of the 2022 Players' Championship.

Team Jacobs began the 2021–22 curling season by winning the 2021 Oakville Labour Day Classic. The next month, they lost in the final of the 2021 Masters, but did not make the playoffs at the 2021 National. The team played in the 2021 Canadian Olympic Curling Trials, where Jacobs led the team to a 7–1 round robin record, tied for first. They then knocked off Kevin Koe in the semifinal before losing to Brad Gushue in the final. The team rolled through 2022 Northern Ontario Men's Provincial Curling Championship, losing just one game en route to the championship. The team was missing Kennedy who was playing as the alternate for Team Canada at the 2022 Olympics. He was replaced by Jordan Chandler. The team then represented Northern Ontario at the 2022 Tim Hortons Brier, where Jacobs led the rink to a 6–2 round robin record. This put them into the Championship round, where they were eliminated by Saskatchewan's Colton Flasch rink. The team then finished the season by making it to the quarterfinals of the 2022 Players' Championship and the semis of the 2022 Champions Cup.

In March 2022, Jacobs announced he would be stepping back from competitive curling. He made his return in 2023, playing third for Reid Carruthers' rink in the Canadian Open. Jacobs will play for the team for the remainder of the season's Slams. He competed in the 2023 Northern Ontario Men's Provincial Curling Championship, skipping a rink of Jordan Chandler, Kyle Chandler, and Jamie Broad; they failed to reach the playoffs.

Eight-ender
During the semifinal of The Dominion 2012 Northern Ontario Men's Curling Championship, Jacobs and team scored a rare eight-ender, in the sixth end to win the game 14–3.

Personal life
Jacobs was born on June 11, 1985 in Sault Ste. Marie. Jacobs holds a bachelor's degree in geography from Algoma University. He currently works as a senior marketing director for World Financial Group. He is married to Shawna Jacobs and has two children.

Grand Slam record

Teams

Notes

References

External links

1985 births
Sportspeople from Sault Ste. Marie, Ontario
Living people
Curlers from Northern Ontario
Brier champions
Olympic curlers of Canada
Curlers at the 2014 Winter Olympics
Algoma University alumni
Olympic gold medalists for Canada
Olympic medalists in curling
Medalists at the 2014 Winter Olympics
Canadian male curlers
Canada Cup (curling) participants